The 2008 Minsk bombing took place just after midnight on 4 July 2008, in Minsk, Belarus and wounded 54 people. The explosion happened near the Hero City monument at a concert to celebrate Belarus' independence. The concert had been attended by Belarus' President, Alexander Lukashenko, who was not hurt and whose officials said was not the target.

A second, larger bomb was discovered before the blast.

No clear motive for the blast has been revealed. However, Belarusian authorities detained four members of the White Legion, a nationalist group, in the days following the attack. The probable perpetrators of the explosion were detained during the investigation of the 2011 Minsk Metro bombing.

References

External links 
 BBC news story

Terrorist incidents in Belarus
2008 crimes in Belarus
Terrorist incidents in Europe in 2008
2000s in Minsk
Crime in Minsk
July 2008 crimes
July 2008 events in Europe